The Stan Musial is a fireboat stationed in the Port of St. Louis in Missouri.
Commissioned in September 2013, she is named after Stan Musial, a St. Louis sports figure, with a long association with the St. Louis Cardinals baseball team. She was placed into service on October 30, 2013.

References

Fireboats of the United States
2013 ships